Abyla is a genus of colonial siphonophore in the subfamily Abylidae and the suborder Calycophorae. The genus contains three species and was established by Quoy and Gaimard in 1827.

Taxonomy
Three species are currently recognized:

A number of former species in the genus have since been synonymized to these three species.

Distribution and habitat
All species in the genus are strictly marine, inhabiting mostly the pelagic zone. They are mainly found in tropico-equatorial and subtropic regions.

References 

Abylidae
Hydrozoan genera
Bioluminescent cnidarians